Danny Houghton (born 25 September 1988) is an English rugby league footballer who plays as a  for Hull F.C. in the Super League. He has played his entire career for his hometown club Hull FC. He is an England Knights international.

Background
Houghton was born in Kingston upon Hull, Humberside, England.

Early career
Since signing for Hull from amateur side East Hull, he has progressed through the club's academy ranks to make his début in 2007.

Playing career

Hull FC
The start of the 2008 season saw Houghton gain a regular place in the first team, often being used from the bench.

Houghton quickly established himself as Hull's starting , and was also handed the vice-captaincy of the team.  He was in Hull's 2013 Challenge Cup Final team, losing out to Wigan Warriors by a score of 16–0.

Houghton had his most successful season to date in 2016.  He starred in Hull's Challenge Cup winning team when he made a try saving tackle in the dying minutes of the game.  Hull beat Warrington Wolves by a narrow score of 12–10, meaning that Hull won the competition.

As a result of Houghton's incredible season he was awarded with the Man of Steel award for Super League player of the year, the first Hull F.C. player to win the award.  He also won the Super League Hit Man award for most tackles in a season with 1289 tackles, an award that he had previously won on 3 occasions.

At the end of the 2016 season, Houghton was included in the 2016 Super League Dream Team.

Houghton's success would continue in 2017 when Hull F.C. won the Challenge Cup for a second year in a row with an 18–14 win over the Wigan Warriors at Wembley Stadium, a repeat of the 2013 final that he had also played in.

In January 2018, Houghton was appointed as the Hull F.C. captain.

He played 14 games for Hull F.C. in the 2020 Super League season including the club's semi-final defeat against Wigan as they got to within one game of the grand final.

In April 2021, Houghton broke the rugby league record for the most tackles in a single match. He made 85 tackles against Warrington Wolves, surpassing the previous record held by Elijah Taylor, who made 77 tackles for Wests Tigers in a match against North Queensland Cowboys in 2015.

International
Houghton was selected for the England Knights in 2011 and 2012.

He is eligible to play for Scotland, and had all rebuffed approaches up until 2021.

Honours

Club
Challenge Cup: (2) 2016, 2017
Runner-up: (1) 2013

Individual
Super League Man of Steel: (1) 2016
Super League Dream Team: (1) 2016
Super League Hit Man: (6) 2011, 2013, 2015, 2016, 2019, 2022

References

External links

Hull FC profile
SL profile

1988 births
Living people
England Knights national rugby league team players
English rugby league players
Hull F.C. captains
Hull F.C. players
Rugby league hookers
Rugby league players from Kingston upon Hull